Nella Island is the northern of two small, rocky islands lying just off the northwest edge of Davis Ice Piedmont, off the north coast of Victoria Land. Named by ANARE (Australian National Antarctic Research Expeditions) after M.V. Nella Dan, one of two expedition ships used by ANARE in 1962 to explore this area.

See also 
 List of antarctic and sub-antarctic islands

Islands of Victoria Land
Pennell Coast